Anthony Bouthier (born 16 June 1992) is a French rugby union player who usually plays the position of a full-back and he currently plays for Montpellier in the French Top 14.

International career

International tries

References

External links
Montpellier profile

1992 births
Living people
Sportspeople from Landes (department)
French rugby union players
France international rugby union players
Rugby union fullbacks
US Dax players
Rugby Club Vannes players
Montpellier Hérault Rugby players